Bouchercon is an annual convention of creators and devotees of mystery and detective fiction. It is named in honour of writer, reviewer, and editor Anthony Boucher; also the inspiration for the Anthony Awards, which have been issued at the convention since 1986. This page details Bouchercon XXII and the 6th Anthony Awards ceremony.

Bouchercon
The convention was held in Pasadena, California on October 11, 1991; running until the 13th. The event was chaired by Len & June Moffatt, founders and editors of the JDM Bibliophile, a fanzine and journal dedicated the works of John D. MacDonald.

Special Guests
Lifetime Achievement award — William Campbell Gault
Guest of Honor — Edward D. Hoch
Guest of Honor (visual media) — William Link
Fan Guest of Honor — Bruce Pelz
Toastmaster — Bill Crider

Anthony Awards
The following list details the awards distributed at the sixth annual Anthony Awards ceremony.

Novel award
Winner:
Sue Grafton, "G" Is for Gumshoe

Shortlist:
Lawrence Block, A Ticket to the Boneyard
Lia Matera, The Good Fight
Sharyn McCrumb, If Ever I Return, Pretty Peggy-O
Julie Smith, New Orleans Mourning

First novel award
Winner:
Patricia Daniels Cornwell, Postmortem

Shortlist:
Diane Mott Davidson, Catering to Nobody
Janet Dawson, Kindred Crimes
Rochelle Krich, Where's Mommy Now?
James McCahery, Grave Undertaking

Paperback original award
Winners:
Rochelle Krich, Where's Mommy Now?
James McCahery, Grave Undertaking

Shortlist:
Jane Haddam, Not a Creature was Stirring
G.J. Oliphant, Dead in the Scrub
Marilyn Wallace, Sisters in Crime 2

Short story award
Winner:
Susan Dunlap, "The Celestial Buffet", from Sisters in Crime 2

Shortlist:
Sharyn McCrumb, "The Luncheon", from Sisters in Crime 2
Sharyn McCrumb, "Remains to be Seen", from Mummy Stories
Sarah Shankman, "Say You're Sorry", from Sisters in Crime 3
Marilyn Wallace, "A Tale of Two Pretties", from Sisters in Crime 3

Critical / Non-fiction award
Winner:
Jon L. Breen & Martin H. Greenberg, Synod Of Sleuths: Essays on Judeo-Christian Detective Fiction

Shortlist:
Serita Deborah Stevens & Anne Klarner, Deadly Doses: A Writer's Guide to Poisons
Peter Lewis, Eric Ambler
S. T. Joshi, John Dickson Carr: a Critical Study
John Conquest, Trouble Is Their Business: Private Eyes in Fiction, Film & Television, 1927-1988

Motion Picture award
Winner:
Presumed Innocent

Shortlist:
Goodfellas
The Grifters

Television series award
Winner:
Mystery!

Shortlist:
Gabriel's Fire
Law & Order
Matlock
Murder, She Wrote

References

Anthony Awards
22
1991 in California